The 1900 United States presidential election in Georgia took place on November 6, 1900, as part of the wider United States presidential election. Voters chose 13 representatives, or electors, to the Electoral College, who voted for president and vice president.

Background
Following Reconstruction, Georgia would be the first former Confederate state to substantially disenfranchise its newly enfranchised freedmen and many poor whites, doing so in the early 1870s. This largely limited the Republican Party to a few North Georgia counties with substantial Civil War Unionist sentiment – chiefly Fannin but also to a lesser extent Pickens, Gilmer and Towns. The Democratic Party served as the guardian of white supremacy against a Republican Party historically associated with memories of Reconstruction, and the main competition became Democratic primaries, which were restricted to whites on the grounds of the Democratic Party being legally a private club. This restriction was originally done by local laws and from 1898 by statewide party laws.

However, politics after the first demobilization by a cumulative poll tax was chaotic. Third-party movements, chiefly the Populist Party, gained support amongst the remaining poor white and black voters in opposition to the planter elite. The fact that Georgia had already substantially reduced its poor white and black electorate two decades ago, alongside pressure from urban elites in Atlanta, and the decline of isolationism due to the success of the Spanish–American War, meant the Populist movement substantially faded in the late 1890s, especially after the dominant Democratic Party instituted a statewide requirement to use primaries rather than conventions.

Vote
Neither candidate campaigned in the state, despite McKinley’s efforts to establish the GOP amongst white southerners during the preceding election. Polls just before election day gave Bryan a majority of between forty thousand and sixty thousand, and this proved accurate, for Bryan won by nearly forty-seven thousand votes or by thirty-eight percent. Bryan even won fifty-nine percent of the ballots in what was typically the state’s most Republican county – Fannin – possibly due to his opposition to imperialist adventures in the Pacific. He is alongside Samuel J. Tilden and Jimmy Carter one of only three post-Civil War candidates to win a majority in Fannin County.

Results

Results by county

Notes

References

Georgia
1900
1900 Georgia (U.S. state) elections